Lykke Frank Hansen (born 8 January 1988) is a Greenlandic handballer for Nykøbing Falster Håndboldklub and the Greenlandic national team.

In 2021 Johannes Groth nominated her for the 2021 Nor.Ca. Women's Handball Championship.

Statistics 

*1) Renamed to EHF European League

References

Weblinks
 Lykke Frank Hansen at European Handball Federation
 Lykke Frank Hansen at Danish Handball Federation

1988 births
Living people
People from Nuuk
Greenlandic female handball players
Expatriate handball players
Nykøbing Falster Håndboldklub players